Dry Branch is a stream in St. Francois County in the U.S. state of Missouri. It is a tributary of the Terre Bleue Creek.

Dry Branch was named for the fact it often runs dry.

See also
List of rivers of Missouri

References

Rivers of St. Francois County, Missouri
Rivers of Missouri